Michael Daedalus Kenny, also known as Mike Kenny, is an American animator, comic book illustrator, storyboard artist and director. His storyboard and directing credits include As Told by Ginger, The Wild Thornberrys, Rugrats, Rocket Power, Camp Lazlo, Finley the Fire Engine, Nickelodeon's Tak and the Power of Juju, Little Bush, and Cartoon Network's The Mr. Men Show.

Kenny's latest projects are Miles from Tomorrowland. He directed the As Told By Ginger episode "Lunatic Lake", which was nominated for a Primetime Emmy Award for Outstanding Animated Program.

References

External links

Living people
American animators
American comics artists
American storyboard artists
American television directors
American animated film directors
American television writers
American male television writers
Year of birth missing (living people)